The District line is a London Underground line running from  in the east and Edgware Road in the west to  in west London, where it splits into multiple branches.

It is the only Underground line to use a bridge to traverse the River Thames, crossing on both the Wimbledon and Richmond branches. Unlike London's deep-level lines, the railway tunnels are just below the surface, and the trains are of a similar size to those on British main lines.

The District line is the busiest of the sub-surface lines and the fifth-busiest line overall on the Underground, with over 208 million passenger journeys recorded in 2017/18.

At first, services were operated using wooden carriages hauled by steam locomotives. Electrification was financed by the American Charles Yerkes, and electric services began in 1905. The railway was absorbed by the London Passenger Transport Board in 1933. In the first half of the 1930s, the Piccadilly line took over the Uxbridge and Hounslow branches, although a peak-hour District line service ran on the Hounslow branch until 1964. Kensington (Olympia) has been served by the District line since 1946, and a short branch to  closed in 1959. The trains carried guards until one-person operation was introduced in 1985.

The signalling system is being upgraded (as part of the Four Lines Modernisation project) as of September 2019 and the previous D Stock trains were fully replaced by seven-car S Stock trains in April 2017.

History

District Railway 

The Metropolitan District Railway (commonly known as the District Railway) was formed to build and operate part of an underground 'inner circle' connecting London's railway termini. The first line opened in December 1868, with services from South Kensington to Westminster; these were operated by the Metropolitan Railway using wooden carriages hauled by steam locomotives. By 1871, when the District began operating its own trains, the railway had extended to West Brompton and a terminus at Mansion House. Between 1 March 1883 and 30 September 1885, the District Railway ran trains between Mansion House and Windsor, via Paddington. Stations after Ealing Broadway (the current terminus) were West Ealing, Hanwell, Southall, Hayes & Harlington, West Drayton, Langley, Slough, and Windsor. The service was discontinued because it was uneconomic.

Hammersmith was reached from Earl's Court, services were extended to Richmond over the tracks of the London and South Western Railway (L&SWR), and branches reached Ealing Broadway, Hounslow and Wimbledon. As part of the project that completed the Circle line in October 1884, the District began to serve Whitechapel. Services began running to Upminster in 1902, after a link to the London, Tilbury & Southend Railway (LT&SR) had been built.

At the start of the 20th century, the District was seeing increased competition from the new electric underground tube lines and trams, and the use of steam locomotives underground led to unpopular smoke-filled stations and carriages. The American Charles Yerkes, who was later to form the Underground Electric Railways of London, financed the needed electrification of the railway and the first electric services ran from Ealing to South Harrow in 1903. Electric multiple-units were introduced on other services in 1905, and East Ham became the eastern terminus. Electric locomotives were used on the L&NWR services from Mansion House to Earl's Court, and in later years exchanged for a steam locomotive on LT&SR services from Southend to Ealing Broadway at Barking.

Hounslow and Uxbridge were served by 2 or 3-car shuttles from Mill Hill Park (now Acton Town); some trains also served South Acton and central London in the peaks. Services were extended again to Barking in 1908 and Upminster in 1932. In 1932 Piccadilly line trains were extended from Hammersmith to South Harrow, taking over the District service from Acton Town to South Harrow, although the District continued to provide a shuttle from South Harrow to Uxbridge. In 1933, Piccadilly line trains reached Hounslow West, the District continuing to run services with an off-peak shuttle from South Acton to Hounslow.

London Transport 
On 1 July 1933, the District Railway amalgamated with other Underground railways, tramway companies and bus operators to form the London Passenger Transport Board, and from 23 October 1933 Piccadilly line trains ran through to Uxbridge and the District line shuttle was withdrawn. Most of the trailer cars on the District line were the 1904–1905 B Stock type with wooden bodies, but motor cars were less than fifteen years old. The 1935–1940 New Works Programme saw the Q Stock formed from these motor cars, upgraded with electro-pneumatic brakes and guard controlled air-operated doors, and the trailers replaced with new vehicles. The off-peak District line services on the Hounslow branch were withdrawn on 29 April 1935 and South Acton served by a shuttle to Acton Town.

The London, Midland and Scottish Railway (LMS) had taken over the L&NWR railway's service from Earl's Court and by the Second World War this had been cut back to an electric Earl's Court to Willesden Junction shuttle. Following bombing of the West London Line in 1940, the LMS and the Metropolitan line services over the West London Line were both suspended. This left the Olympia exhibition centre without a railway service, so after the war the Kensington Addison Road station was renamed Kensington (Olympia) and served by a District line shuttle from Earl's Court. R Stock, composed of new cars and the Q Stock trailers that had been built in 1938, replaced the trains with hand-operated sliding doors that remained. The new trains were built between 1949 and 1959, and after 1952 trains were constructed from aluminium, saving weight. One train was left unpainted as an experiment and considered a success, so between 1963 and 1968 trains were left unpainted or painted white or grey to match. The transfer of CO/CP Stock from the Metropolitan line in the early 1960s allowed some of the Q stock to be scrapped. The slow tracks on the former LT&SR line to Upminster were shared with steam locomotive hauled goods and passenger services, until 1961 when the District took over exclusive use of the DC electrified lines.

The South Acton shuttle was withdrawn on 28 February 1959, followed by the peak hour District line through service to Hounslow on 9 October 1964. The whole District line service could not run through Aldgate East as this station was also served by Hammersmith & City trains, so some trains terminated at a bay platform at Mansion House, leaving the line east to Tower Hill overcrowded. Tower Hill station was also cramped, so the station was rebuilt with three platforms on a new site. This opened in 1967 and a year later trains reversed at the new station.

Services were operated with 6 cars off-peak and 8 cars during peak hours until 1971, when trains were reformed as fixed 7-car trains, and some 6-car trains for the Edgware Road branch. The CO/CP and R Stock were replaced in the late 1970s by new trains with unpainted aluminium bodies. A shorter train was needed on the Edgware Road branch due to the platform lengths so more of the C stock units, then already in use on the Circle and Hammersmith and City lines, were built. The rest of the District line could use longer trains and new D Stock trains were introduced between 1979 and 1983. One person operation of the trains was proposed in 1972, but due to conflict with the trade unions was not introduced on the District line until 1985. In 2003, the infrastructure of the District line was partly privatised in a public–private partnership, managed by the Metronet consortium. Metronet went into administration in 2007 and the local government body Transport for London took over responsibilities.

Route

Map

Railway line 

The two sections over which main line trains run, from East Putney to Wimbledon, and from Gunnersbury to Richmond, have the centre rail bonded to the running rails. West of Earl's Court, there are four branches. At Ealing Broadway station, the District line has platforms north of the Central line and the Great Western Main Line out of Paddington. From Acton Town to Barons Court, the line has four tracks, paired by use: the District line uses the outer pair and the non-stopping Piccadilly line trains use the inner pair. At Richmond station, the London Overground and District line platforms are north of the Waterloo to Reading line through platforms. The two tracks which cross the Thames at Kew Railway Bridge are shared with the London Overground trains until Gunnersbury junction, after which the District line tracks join the four-track District and Piccadilly lines just before Turnham Green station.

On the main line, there are cross-platform interchanges at Acton Town, Hammersmith and Barons Court stations, after which the Piccadilly line tracks descend into tunnels, while the District line becomes two tracks through West Kensington station. Before the line enters Earl's Court station, the short Kensington (Olympia) branch joins at a flat junction and the Wimbledon branch at a grade-separated junction. On the Wimbledon branch, the District line at Wimbledon station is west of the South West Main Line platforms, then the two-track line has a junction at East Putney station with the Hounslow Loop Line, before passing over the River Thames on Fulham Railway Bridge; the line continues by passing under the West London Railway and coming alongside it at West Brompton station before the junction with the main line and the four-platform Earl's Court station.

East of Earl's Court there is a grade-separated junction off the main line to the Edgware Road branch. This follows the Circle line after High Street Kensington station where there are also two bay platforms for the District line. After Paddington station this branch joins the Hammersmith & City line at Praed Street junction, before terminating at the four-platform Edgware Road. The main line joins the Circle line at Gloucester Road and the line and stations are in cut-and-cover tunnels, meeting the Thames at Westminster station, after which the railway is in the Victoria Embankment on the north bank of the river. At Tower Hill station, there is a bay platform.

After Tower Hill, the Circle line diverges, the District line joining the Hammersmith & City line just before Aldgate East station. The line passes over the London Overground at Whitechapel station before continuing on the  Whitechapel & Bow Railway to Bow Road, where the line surfaces, and Bromley-by-Bow, where the line runs alongside the London, Tilbury and Southend line from Fenchurch Street station. There is an interchange with this line at the next station, West Ham, as well as with the Jubilee line and the Docklands Light Railway. There is a bay platform at the next station, Plaistow, and the Hammersmith & City line terminates at Barking station. The District line follows the London, Tilbury and Southend Railway for another eight stations, before terminating at Upminster station.

The line mainly runs in cut and cover tunnels between West Kensington and Bromley-by-Bow, including the Edgware Road branch. However, due to the nature of sub-surface lines, the cutting is occasionally left open both at and between stations for ventilation. West of Earls Court, the line is entirely surface level, with the exception of the Hammersmith and Fulham Broadway stations, which are in cuttings built over by recent developments. There is also a small section of tunnel between Southfields and East Putney.

Services 

The off-peak service since 9 December 2012 is:
 6 tph (trains per hour) Ealing Broadway to Upminster
 6 tph Richmond to Upminster
 6 tph Wimbledon to Tower Hill, of which 3 continue to Barking
 6 tph Wimbledon to Edgware Road
 3 tph Kensington (Olympia) to High Street Kensington at weekends, as well as 7 trains daily to or from Kensington (Olympia) on weekdays, of which 1 continue to Edgware Road. A 2 tph service operates on weekday exhibition days.

This gives a service of 18 trains per hour (a train every 3–4 minutes) between Earl's Court and Tower Hill. Together with the Circle line, there are 24 trains per hour (a train every 2.5 minutes) between Gloucester Road and Tower Hill. 208 million passenger journeys were made on the District line in 2011/12.

There are additional trains during peak hours. The central section from Earl's Court to Aldgate East is in Zone 1 and to the west Ealing Broadway and Wimbledon are in Zone 3 and Richmond in Zone 4. To the east the line runs to Upminster in Zone 6.

Rolling stock

S Stock 

The current 7-car S Stock trains began to enter service on the line in 2013, beginning with services between Olympia and West Ham, gradually replacing the C and D Stock. Like the 8-car variants now in use on the Metropolitan line, these trains are part of Bombardier's Movia family, with air-conditioning, as the sub-surface tunnels (unlike those on the deep-level tube lines) are able to disperse the exhausted hot air.

The trains have regenerative brakes, allowing them to return around 20 per cent of their energy to the network. Traction voltage was increased in 2017 from nominal 630 V to 750 V to give better performance and allow the trains to return more energy to the network through their regenerative brakes. 630 V section remains Barons Court-Ealing Broadway. The service was run by D78 Stock until April 2017.

Depots 
The S Stock trains are maintained at Ealing Common Depot and Upminster Depot. Ealing Common Depot was built by the District Railway when it was electrified in the early 1900s. Upminster depot was built 1956–1958 when the District line tracks were segregated. Trains may also be stabled in the sidings east of Barking alongside Hammersmith & City Line trains.

Four Lines Modernisation (4LM) 

It was planned that a new signalling system would be used first on the sub-surface lines from the end of 2016, but signalling contractor Bombardier was released from its contract by agreement in December 2013 amid heavy criticism of the procurement process and London Underground subsequently awarded the contract for the project to Thales in August 2015.

With the introduction of S7 Stock, the track, electrical supply, and signalling systems are being upgraded in a programme planned to increase peak-hour capacity on the line by 27 per cent by the end of 2023. A single control room for the sub-surface railway opened at Hammersmith on 6 May 2018, and Communications Based Control (CBTC) provided by Thales will progressively replace 'fixed block' signalling equipment dating back to the 1940s.

The rollout of CBTC has been split into sections, each known as a Signal Migration Area (SMA), and are located on the line as follows:

List of stations

Open stations 
In order from west to east

Previously served stations 
Now served by the Piccadilly line, the Hounslow branch opened to the now closed Hounslow Town on 1 May 1883 and was extended on a separate route to Hounslow West on 21 July 1884. The District line served the present Piccadilly line stations between Acton Town and Hounslow West as well as the former station of Osterley & Spring Grove (closed 1934) until District line 
services were withdrawn on 9 October 1964. From 13 June 1905 until 28 February 1959, the District line ran a one-stop shuttle between Acton Town and South Acton.

Also now served by the Piccadilly line, the South Harrow branch opened from north of Ealing Common on 28 June 1903 and extended over Metropolitan Railway tracks to Uxbridge on 1 March 1910. The District line served the present Piccadilly line stations between North Ealing and South Harrow until 4 July 1932 and the stations between Rayners Lane and Uxbridge until 25 October 1933. The District Railway also served the now closed Park Royal & Twyford Abbey until its replacement by Park Royal on 6 July 1931.

Between 1 March 1883 and 30 September 1885, the District Railway provided a service to Windsor, serving: West Ealing, Hanwell, Southall, Hayes & Harlington, West Drayton, Langley, Slough, and Windsor.

From 1910 to 1939, the District line's eastbound service ran as far as Southend-on-Sea and Shoeburyness.

Currently part of the East London line, the District Railway branched away from the main line west of Whitechapel and served stations between Shadwell and New Cross from 1 October 1884 until 31 July 1905.

Between Whitechapel and Aldgate East, the District line served St. Mary's (Whitechapel Road) from 1 October 1884 to 30 April 1938, closing when Aldgate East station moved.

From 25 September 1882 until its closure on 12 October 1884, Tower of London station was served by the District Railway.

Abandoned Plans
In 1911, the Underground Electric Railways Company of London agreed to finance the construction of the Wimbledon and Sutton Railway and extend District Railway trains over its route to Sutton with eight intermediate stations. Construction of the line was delayed by World War I and, as part of a deal with the Southern Railway (SR) to agree to the extension of the City and South London Railway to Morden, construction of the line was taken over by the SR.

Fictional stations
Walford East is a fictional District line station in the BBC television soap opera EastEnders, and since February 2010 episodes have used Computer-generated imagery (CGI) of District line trains running into the station. The production tube map situates this station in place of Bromley-by-Bow.

In the Sherlock episode "The Empty Hearse", a fictional unopened terminus station called Sumatra Road (situated underneath the Houses of Parliament as a disused branch line from Westminster Station) was created for the episode's story of a terrorism plot. The station was actually filmed at Aldwych with ex-Northern line 1972 stock which caused continuity errors as deep-level trains and tunnels were used when the District line is sub-surface.

West Ashfield tube station, despite its name, is a mock-up District line station in the third floor of a building used for training of TfL staff in a simulated environment; the "station" is slated to be closed by 2024. Maps within the facility show West Ashfield as a station on the District line between West Kensington and Earl's Court.

See also 

 Fourth rail
 Lillie Bridge Depot

Notes

References

Citations

Sources

Further reading

External links 

 
 
 

London Underground lines
Railway lines opened in 1868
Transport in the London Borough of Barking and Dagenham
Transport in the London Borough of Ealing
Transport in the London Borough of Hammersmith and Fulham
Transport in the London Borough of Havering
Transport in the London Borough of Hounslow
Transport in the Royal Borough of Kensington and Chelsea
Transport in the London Borough of Merton
Transport in the London Borough of Newham
Transport in the London Borough of Richmond upon Thames
Transport in the City of London
Transport in the London Borough of Tower Hamlets
Transport in the London Borough of Wandsworth
Transport in the City of Westminster
Standard gauge railways in London